Nicolae Hönigsberg (also known as Miklós Kinigli; 28 August 1901 – 8 December 1944) was a Romanian footballer of Hungarian and Jewish ethnicity. He competed in the men's tournament at the 1924 Summer Olympics. Hönigsberg, which was also known at that time under the name of Kinigli, was born when Oradea was part of Austria-Hungary and played its entire career for the local football club, Club Atletic Oradea, in 53 league matches and scored 18 goals.

Hönigsberg died in 1944, at the age of 43, in the Mauthausen concentration camp, during the World War II, being one of the Holocaust victims.

References

External links

1901 births
1944 deaths
People from Bihor County
Sportspeople from Oradea
Romanian footballers
Hungarian footballers
Romania international footballers
Olympic footballers of Romania
Association football midfielders
Liga I players
CA Oradea players
Footballers at the 1924 Summer Olympics
Hungarian people who died in Mauthausen concentration camp
Hungarian Jews who died in the Holocaust
Romanian Jews who died in the Holocaust
Hungarian civilians killed in World War II
Romanian civilians killed in World War II